The Frank and Matilda Binz House is a historic two-story Mediterranean Revival home located in Sarasota, Florida. Built in 1926 for Frank Binz, it is located at 5050 Bay Shore Road. On August 5, 1994, it was added  to the U.S. National Register of Historic Places.

References and external links

 Sarasota County listings at National Register of Historic Places
 Frank and Matilda Binz House at Portal of Historic Resources, State of Florida

Houses in Sarasota, Florida
Houses on the National Register of Historic Places in Sarasota County, Florida
Mediterranean Revival architecture in Florida
Houses completed in 1926